Fine-tuning may refer to:

 Fine-tuning (machine learning)
 Fine-tuning (physics)

See also
 Tuning (disambiguation)